Manistee may refer to:

Places 
 Manistee, Michigan 
 Manistee, Alabama
 Manistee County, Michigan
 Manistee County-Blacker Airport
 Manistee Township, Michigan
 Manistee National Forest, jointly administered as part of the Huron-Manistee National Forests in Michigan
 Manistee River, Michigan
 Manistee Light, at the mouth of the river
 Manistee Railroad, Michigan

Ships 
 , a steamboat that disappeared on Lake Superior in 1883
 , a merchant steamship that was sunk in 1941
  US Navy tugboat
  US Navy tugboat

See also
Manatee